Raúl Servín Monetti (born 29 April 1963) is a Mexican former professional footballer, who played for UNAM Pumas and the Mexico national team. He played in the 1986 FIFA World Cup in Mexico, where he scored a goal in the second round match against Bulgaria.

Career
Servín began playing professional football with Pumas, making his Primera debut against Atlético Español during the 1980–81 season. In his 14-year playing career, he also appeared for Monarcas Morelia, Cruz Azul and Toros Neza.

Personal
Servín's son, Raúl Servín Molina, is also a Pumas footballer who made his Primera debut against Monterrey on 3 August 2011.

References

External links

1963 births
Living people
Mexican people of Italian descent
Mexico under-20 international footballers
Mexico international footballers
1986 FIFA World Cup players
Club Universidad Nacional footballers
Atlético Morelia players
Cruz Azul footballers
Toros Neza footballers
Liga MX players
Footballers from Mexico City
Mexican footballers
Association football defenders